Loral John Wyatt (April 6, 1900 - December 5, 1970) was a professional baseball player. He appeared in four games in Major League Baseball in 1924 for Cleveland Indians, all as a right fielder. During his brief major league career, he had two hits in 12 at-bats, with one run scored.

Wyatt was born in Petersburg, Indiana and died in Oblong, Illinois.

External links

Major League Baseball right fielders
Cleveland Indians players
Baseball players from Indiana
1900 births
1970 deaths
People from Petersburg, Indiana
People from Crawford County, Illinois